Architects Assist (AA) is a national organisation of Australian architects, other built environment professionals and students providing pro bono disaster recovery and resilience advice to individuals and communities affected by natural disasters, such as bushfires or floods, or other adverse circumstances. The organisation operates under the umbrella of the Australian Institute of Architects.

History 
Architects Assist was launched on 4 January 2020 by architect Jiri Lev in response to the 2019-20 Australian bushfires disaster, as a "platform for equitable access to sustainable and resilient architecture".  By 7 January hundreds of architecture firms, sole practitioners and student volunteers had registered as members and the organisation started receiving first assistance requests from bushfire victims. The organisation operated grassroots, without funding. 

On 9 January 2020 Architects Assist formally came under the umbrella of the Australian Institute of Architects. In February 2020 it had about 550 member architecture firms and 1500 architecture student volunteers.

In March 2020 Architects Assist begun including members from related professions such as town planners (PIA) and landscape architects (AILA) and had about 600 participating firms.
After broad initial response both national and global, the bushfire recovery was slowed down by the 2020 coronavirus outbreak in Australia. Architects Assist representatives toured bushfire-affected regions across Victoria, New South Wales and South Australia. Simultaneously, local bushfire recovery community workshops were organised by member architects. As of late 2020 hundreds of residential, commercial and civic projects initiated through the organisation were under progress.

The initiative was fully taken over by the Australian Institute of Architects in March 2021 to continue serving individuals and communities affected by disasters and other adverse circumstances.

In 2022 Architects Assist provided assistance in Eastern Australia floods recovery.

See also 

 Emergency Architects Foundation
 Engineers Without Borders
 Resilience (engineering and construction)
 Sustainable architecture

References

External links 
 Assistance request page
 Architects Assist homepage

Humanitarian aid organizations
Architecture organisations based in Australia
Organizations established in 2020
2020 establishments in Australia
Architecture-related professional associations